The 1978–79 season saw the 28th competition for the FDGB-Pokal, the East German national football cup. Starting from the third round, the fixtures were played over two legs, culminating in a one-legged final.

The competition began with three qualifying matches between three second-tier DDR-Liga clubs and three Bezirkspokal finalists. Two of the finalists, Dynamo Gera and BSG Stahl Thale, qualified for the first round.

The first round pitted 48 DDR-Liga sides and 24 Bezirkspokal finalists against each other. After an intermediate round with 36 teams, the 14 DDR-Oberliga clubs joined in the second round. The two remaining Bezirkspokal finalists Stahl Thale and Dynamo Fürstenwalde were eliminated in this round, along with no fewer than five Oberliga sides: Wismut Aue, Chemie Böhlen, Chemie Halle, BSG Stahl Riesa and BSG Sachsenring Zwickau.

Of the 6 DDR-Liga teams that had reached the third round, only two survived to reach the quarter-finals, FC Energie Cottbus and BSG Motor Suhl. However, both were then eliminated by last year's finalists 1. FC Magdeburg and Dynamo Dresden, respectively. Dresden went out to Berliner FC Dynamo in the semifinals, while 1. FC Magdeburg went on to reach the final with two wins over 1. FC Lokomotive Leipzig.

Qualification round

First round

Intermediate round

Second round

Third round

Quarter-finals

Semifinals

Final

References 
 https://www.rsssf.org/tablesd/ddr79.html	

1978-79
East
Cup